Béla Czafik (23 September 1937 – 17 November 2005) was a Hungarian volleyball player. He competed in the men's tournament at the 1964 Summer Olympics.

References

External links
 

1937 births
2005 deaths
Hungarian men's volleyball players
Olympic volleyball players of Hungary
Volleyball players at the 1964 Summer Olympics
Sportspeople from Fejér County
20th-century Hungarian people
21st-century Hungarian people